German resistance can refer to:
 Freikorps, German nationalist paramilitary groups resisting German communist uprisings and the Weimar Republic government
 German resistance to Nazism
 Landsturm, German resistance groups fighting against France during the Napoleonic Wars
 Volkssturm, a German resistance group and militia created by the NSDAP near the end of World War II
 Werwolf, a German guerrilla and pro-Nazi resistance organisation resisting Allied occupation of Germany